Apostol Muzac (born 6 July 1987 in Bucharest, Romania) is a Romanian football player.

Career
While playing for Steaua II București, Apostol was loaned out to Unirea Urziceni. He made his Liga I debut on 11 September 2010, in a match against Steaua București.

External links
 
 RETROSPECTIVĂ: Mânjii Ligii a II-a

1987 births
Living people
Footballers from Bucharest
Romanian footballers
Association football midfielders
FC Steaua II București players
FC Unirea Urziceni players
CS Concordia Chiajna players
FC Universitatea Cluj players
AFC Săgeata Năvodari players
ASC Daco-Getica București players
FC Delta Dobrogea Tulcea players
Liga I players
Liga II players